Live the Life is an album by Michael W. Smith. One notable song on this album was "In My Arms Again," which Michael W. Smith wrote for the film Titanic.  There were 26 songs written and completed for the album, whose release date was pushed back twice as Smith wasn't fully satisfied with the track list.  Along with the 12 songs which eventually made it on the album, the tracks "Greater Than We Understand" and "Evening Show" were released on the B-sides of the CD singles for "Live the Life" and "Love Me Good" respectively.  The remaining 12 songs appeared in some form on Smith's 1999 album This Is Your Time.

"Song for Rich" is an instrumental tribute to Rich Mullins who died in a car crash in September 1997.

Track listing

Personnel 
 Michael W. Smith – vocals, keyboards (1, 4–8, 10, 11, 12), acoustic piano (2, 3, 5), programming (2, 5, 6, 10), guitars (3, 7, 9), Hammond B3 organ (6)
 Mark Heimmerman – keyboards (1, 3, 4, 5, 8, 9, 11, 12), Hammond B3 organ (1), backing vocals (1, 3, 5, 8, 9)
 Bryan Lenox – programming (2, 6, 10), keyboards (10)
 Phil Madeira – Hammond B3 organ (2)
 Dennis Patton – programming (5, 9)
 Marc Harris – Hammond B3 organ (5)
 Stephen Lipson – programming (7), guitars (7)
 George Cocchini – guitars (1, 3)
 Jerry McPherson – guitars (1–4, 6, 8, 12)
 Will Owsley – guitars (1)
 Tom Hemby – guitars (4)
 Micah Wilshire – backing vocals (1, 5, 6), guitars (3)
 Nik Kershaw – guitars (7)
 Robbie McIntosh – guitars (7)
 Chris Rodriguez – backing vocals (6), guitars (8, 9, 12)
 Dann Huff – guitars (9)
 Brent Barcus – guitars (10)
 Brent Milligan – bass (1)
 Jackie Street – bass (1, 2, 3, 8, 9, 12)
 Jimmie Lee Sloas – bass (4)
 Dan Needham – drums (1, 3, 4)
 Neil Conti – drums (7)
 Scott Williamson – drums (8, 9, 12)
 Terry McMillan – percussion (1–5, 9)
 Luis Jardim – percussion (7)
 Steve Brewster – percussion (8, 12)
 Ronn Huff – string arrangements and conductor (3)
 Tom Howard – string arrangements and conductor (9), orchestrations and arrangements (10)
 The Nashville String Machine – strings (3, 9)
 John Mock – woodwinds (11), woodwind arrangements (11), tin whistle (12)
 Peter Cairney – woodwinds (11)
 Hunter Lee – woodwinds (11)
 William Verdier – woodwinds (11)
 Judson Spence – backing vocals  (1, 3, 5)
 Wayne Kirkpatrick – backing vocals (4, 9, 12)
 Michael Black – backing vocals (5)
 Lori Wilshire – backing vocals (6)
 Brent Bourgeois – backing vocals (8)

Choir on "Love Me Good"
 Da'dra Crawford, Vicki Hampton, Mark Heimmerman, Nicole C. Mullen, George Pendergrass, Scat Springs, Lori Wilshire and Micah Wilshire

Production 
 Producers – Mark Heimmerman (Tracks 1–5, 8, 9, 11 & 12); Michael W. Smith (1–6, 8-12); Stephen Lipson (Track 7).
 Executive Producer – Michael Blanton 
 Engineers – Keith Compton, Tom Laune, Bryan Lenox, Heff Moraes and Todd Robbins.
 Assistant Engineers – Rob Burrell, Robert "Void" Caprio, Dave Dillbeck, Patrick Kelly, Alan Litten, Shawn McLean and Tim Putnam.
 Recorded at Deer Valley, Fun Attic, The Bennett House and Dark Horse Recording Studio (Franklin, TN); The Tracking Room (Nashville, TN); The Aquarium (London, England).
 Mixing – Joe Baldridge, Bryan Lenox and Heff Moraes.
 Mix Assistants – Joe Costa and Adam Hatley.
 Mixed at Deer Valley and The Playground (Franklin, TN); Sixteenth Avenue Sound (Nashville, TN); The Aquarium (London, England).
 Computer Editing – Dan Rudin
 Mastered by Hank Williams at MasterMix (Nashville, TN).
 Photography –  Jimmy Abegg
 Art Direction and Design – Diana Lussenden

Chart performance

References

Michael W. Smith albums
1998 albums
Reunion Records albums
Albums produced by Stephen Lipson